Todd Perry may refer to:

Todd Perry (American football) (born 1970), NFL player
Todd Perry (ice hockey) (born 1986), Canadian ice hockey player 
Todd Perry (tennis) (born 1976),  Australian  tennis player